Mario Nasalli Rocca di Corneliano (12 August 1903 – 9 November 1988) was an Italian cardinal of the Catholic Church. He served as Prefect of the Apostolic Palace from 1967 until his death, and was elevated to the cardinalate in 1969.

Biography
Nasalli Rocca di Corneliano was born in Piacenza to Count Camillo Nasalli Rocca and Marchioness Caterina Taffini d'Accegliano. His father died when Mario was a child, and his uncle was Giovanni Nasalli Rocca di Corneliano, who was later Archbishop of Bologna. Nasalli Rocca studied at the Pontifical Roman Seminary, Pontifical Roman Athenaeum S. Apollinare, and the Pontifical Ecclesiastical Academy before being ordained to the priesthood on 8 April 1927.

He then began pastoral work in Rome, and was made a canon of St. Peter's Basilica. After being raised to the rank of a Privy Chamberlain of His Holiness on 22 November 1931, he later became a Domestic Prelate of His Holiness on 1 July 1949. Pope John XXIII named Nasalli Rocca as Master of the Papal Chamber the day after his election, on 29 October 1958. Upon the death of John XXIII on 3 June 1963, Nasalli Rocca and all major Vatican officials, in accord with custom, automatically lost their positions during the sede vacante. He was later confirmed as the papal majordomo by Pope Paul VI on the following 21 June. He also became Prefect of the Apostolic Palace on 1 April 1967.

On 11 April 1969, Nasalli Rocca was appointed Titular Archbishop of Antium by Paul VI. He received his episcopal consecration on the following 20 April from Cardinal Paolo Marella, with Archbishop Diego Venini and Bishop Alberto Scola, serving as co-consecrators, in St. Peter's Basilica. Pope Paul later created Nasalli Rocca Cardinal-Deacon of S. Giovanni Battista Decollato in the consistory of 28 April of that same year. He was one of the cardinal electors who participated in the conclaves of August and October 1978, which selected Popes John Paul I and John Paul II respectively. After ten years' standing as a Cardinal-Deacon, Nasalli Rocca opted to become a cardinal priest, with the same titular church, on 30 June 1979. He then lost the right to participate any future conclaves upon reaching age 80 on 12 August 1983.

Cardinal Nasalli Rocca di Corneliano died in a Roman clinic, where he had been admitted a week earlier, at age 85. He is buried in his native Piacenza.

References

External links
Catholic-Hierarchy 
Cardinals of the Holy Roman Church

1903 births
1988 deaths
20th-century Italian cardinals
Italian nobility
Prefects of the Papal Household
Knights Commander of the Order of Merit of the Federal Republic of Germany
Pontifical Ecclesiastical Academy alumni
Cardinals created by Pope Paul VI
Pontifical Roman Seminary alumni
People from Piacenza